Bowker Place is a historic commercial building at 144–156 Essex Street in Salem, Massachusetts. Built in 1830 by William Manning, this handsome two-story Greek Revival brick building has had a significant role in the civic and economic history of Salem. It was acquired by Joel Bowker in 1844 after Manning went bankrupt. Its tenants have included banks, insurance companies, and the Salem Police Court. One prominent retailer who began operations in this building was William Filene, founder of the Filene's department store chain.

The building was listed on the National Register of Historic Places in 1983. It is immediately adjacent to portions of the Downtown Salem District.

See also
 National Register of Historic Places listings in Salem, Massachusetts
 National Register of Historic Places listings in Essex County, Massachusetts

References

Commercial buildings on the National Register of Historic Places in Massachusetts
Buildings and structures in Salem, Massachusetts
National Register of Historic Places in Salem, Massachusetts